Nehammer is a surname.

List of people with the surname 

 Christian Nehammer (born 1976), Austrian sailor
 Karl Nehammer (born 1972), Chancellor of Austria

See also 

 Neuhammer
 Nehammer government

Surnames
Surnames of German origin
German-language surnames